The Kowloon West geographical constituency was one of the five geographical constituencies of the Legislative Council of Hong Kong from 1998 to 2021. It was established in 1998 for the first SAR Legislative Council election and was abolished under the 2021 overhaul of the Hong Kong electoral system. In the 2016 Legislative Council election, it elected six members of the Legislative Council using the Hare quota of party-list proportional representation. It had 602,733 registered electorates in 2020. The constituency corresponded to the districts of Yau Tsim Mong, Sham Shui Po, and Kowloon City.

History

The single-constituency single-vote system was replaced by the party-list proportional representation system for the first SAR Legislative Council election designed by Beijing to reward the weaker pro-Beijing candidates and dilute the electoral strength of the majority pro-democrats. Three seats were allocated to Kowloon consisting the districts of Yau Tsim Mong, Sham Shui Po and Kowloon City in 1998. The Democratic Party won more than 55 per cent of the vote with Lau Chin-shek and James To elected. The remaining seat was won by pro-Beijing Democratic Alliance for the Betterment of Hong Kong (DAB) chairman Jasper Tsang. Frederick Fung of the Hong Kong Association for Democracy and People's Livelihood (ADPL) however was defeated over his decision to join the Beijing-controlled Provisional Legislative Council in 1996.

In the 2000 Legislative Council election, an extra seat was added to the constituency which was taken by Frederick Fung. In the 2004 election, Lau Chin-shek who quit the Democratic Party ran as a nonpartisan, while Jasper Tsang's DAB ticket rose to the top with more than 27 per cent. The seats of the Kowloon West was increased to five seats due to the reapportionment, which attracted Civic Party and the Liberal Party among others contesting for the new seat. As Lau Chin-shek ran a low-profile campaign, Wong Yuk-man of the League of Social Democrats (LSD) and pro-Beijing independent Priscilla Leung emerged victorious, while Starry Lee succeeding Jasper Tsang instead who ran in Hong Kong Island.

In 2010, the LSD launched the "Five Constituencies Referendum" with the Civic Party to pressure the government on the 2012 constitutional reform package. Wong Yuk-man resigned in Kowloon West to trigger a by-election in which he was re-elected with a low turnout due to the government and pro-Beijing boycott. In the 2012 Legislative Council election, James To and Frederick Fung switched to the newly created District Council (Second) "super seat", while Helena Wong successfully succeeding To, Tam Kwok-kiu failed to gain a seat for the ADPL and was replaced by Claudia Mo of the Civic Party.

The rise of the localists in the 2016 Legislative Council election was reflected in Kowloon West, where university lecturer Lau Siu-lai and activist Yau Wai-ching each gained a seat when the constituency was added an extra seat due to the reapportionment. In return, Wong Yuk-man who now represented the Proletariat Political Institute (PPI) was ousted unexpectedly by Yau Wai-ching with a narrow margin of 424 votes, 0.15 per cent of the vote share. The pro-Beijing camp took a conservative strategy by fielding only two tickets led by Ann Chiang of the DAB and Priscilla Leung of the Business and Professionals Alliance for Hong Kong (BPA), making it the constituency electing all women.

Yau was soon disqualified from the office due to her oath-taking controversy, followed by Lau Siu-lai who was also disqualified for her oath-taking manner. Two by-elections were held in March and November 2018 where pro-Beijing candidates Vincent Cheng of the DAB and independent Chan Hoi-yan surprisingly both beat the pro-democracy candidates, first times pro-Beijing camp won a majority in a direct election in more than 20 years. Chan, however, was unseated in 2020, as the court viewed Lau Siu-lai's disqualification from running in the November 2018 by-election was unlawful.

Returned members
Below are all the members since the creation of the Kowloon West constituency. The number of seats allocated to Kowloon West was increased from three to six between 1998 and 2016 due to its enlargement. Councillors representing this area include:

Summary of seats won

Vote share summary

Election results
The largest remainder method (with Hare quota) of the proportional representative electoral system was introduced in 1998, replacing the single-member constituencies of the 1995 election. Elected candidates are shown in bold. Brackets indicate the quota + remainder.

2010s

2000s

1990s

See also 
 List of constituencies of Hong Kong

References

Kowloon
Constituencies of Hong Kong
Constituencies of Hong Kong Legislative Council
1998 establishments in Hong Kong
Constituencies established in 1998
2021 disestablishments in Hong Kong
Constituencies disestablished in 2021